The 1996 Japan Open Tennis Championships was a combined men's and women's tennis tournament played on outdoor hard courts at the Ariake Coliseum in Tokyo in Japan that was part of the Championship Series of the 1996 ATP Tour and of Tier III of the 1996 WTA Tour. The tournament ran from April 15 through April 21, 1996. Pete Sampras and Kimiko Date won the singles titles.

Finals

Men's singles

 Pete Sampras defeated  Richey Reneberg 6–4, 7–5
 It was Sampras' 4th title of the year and the 42nd of his career.

Women's singles

 Kimiko Date defeated  Amy Frazier 7–5, 6–4
 It was Date's 1st title of the year and the 6th of her career.

Men's doubles

 Todd Woodbridge /  Mark Woodforde defeated  Mark Knowles /  Rick Leach 6–2, 6–3
 It was Woodbridge's 5th title of the year and the 45th of his career. It was Woodforde's 6th title of the year and the 49th of his career.

Women's doubles

 Kimiko Date /  Ai Sugiyama defeated  Amy Frazier /  Kimberly Po 7–6, 6–7, 6–3
 It was Date's 2nd title of the year and the 7th of her career. It was Sugiyama's only title of the year and the 3rd of her career.

References

External links
 Official website
 ATP tournament profile

 
Japan Open Tennis Championships
Japan Open Tennis Championships
Japan Open (tennis)
Japan Open Tennis Championships
Japan Open Tennis Championships